Vaxi jonesella is a moth in the family Crambidae. It was described by Harrison Gray Dyar Jr. in 1913. It is found in Paraná, Brazil.

References

Moths described in 1913
Moths of South America